Analyta pervinca is a moth in the family Crambidae. It was described by Jean Ghesquière in 1942. It is found in the Democratic Republic of the Congo, where it has been recorded from Katanga Province.

References

Moths described in 1942
Spilomelinae
Moths of Africa